Splashtown San Antonio was a water park located in San Antonio, Texas, USA. Its most recent name was "Splashtown USA".

The park opened in 1985 as Water Park USA. It was sold to Wave Management, its second owner, in 1989. Its third owner since it opened was Chrismari Inc. of San Antonio. Chrismari Inc. bought it in 1991 and formed Surf San Antonio Inc. to manage the property, with Keith D. Kinney serving as president and general manager. International Theme Park Services Inc. announced in 2005 that it was looking for a buyer for it. During 2006, Mr. Kinney bought out the other shareholders' interest in the property and became the sole owner.

In October 2021, it was announced that Splashtown San Antonio would close to make way for a car dealership.

References

External links

Tourist attractions in San Antonio
Defunct amusement parks in Texas
Water parks in Texas
Buildings and structures in San Antonio
1985 establishments in Texas
2021 disestablishments in Texas